Saqqaf is a surname of Arabic origin (Arabic: ٱلسَّقَّاف). It has the variants of Al Saggoff and Al Saqqaf. People with the surname include:

Abdul-Hafez al-Saqqaf, Yemeni military officer
Abdulaziz Al-Saqqaf (1951–1999), Yemeni economist, and journalist
Omar Al Saqqaf (1923–1974), Saudi Arabian diplomat and politician

See also
Alsagoff family, Arab Singaporean family

Surnames of Yemeni origin
Surnames of Saudi Arabian origin